Sander Andreassen Øverjordet (born 8 April 1996) is a Norwegian handball player for KIF Kolding and the Norwegian national team.

He is also a former Norwegian champion in badminton back in 2013.

Honours
 European Championship:
: 2020

References

External links

1996 births
Living people
Norwegian male handball players
Handball players from Oslo